Thomas Haasmann (born 2 August 1961) is an Austrian judoka. He competed in the men's half-middleweight event at the 1984 Summer Olympics.

References

1961 births
Living people
Austrian male judoka
Olympic judoka of Austria
Judoka at the 1984 Summer Olympics
Place of birth missing (living people)
20th-century Austrian people